Columbia Male Academy and Columbia Female Academy were schools in Columbia, South Carolina. South Carolina governor John Taylor donated land for the private school. Hugh S. Thompson served as a principal.  The state legislature appointed trustees in 1792 and the school was incorporated in 1795. A female academy was also established. The school was merged with the public school system in 1883. A historical marker commemorates its history.

References

Defunct schools in South Carolina